A health system, health care system or healthcare system is an organization of people, institutions, and resources that delivers health care services to meet the health needs of target populations.

There is a wide variety of health systems around the world, with as many histories and organizational structures as there are nations. Implicitly, nations must design and develop health systems in accordance with their needs and resources, although common elements in virtually all health systems are primary healthcare and public health measures. In some countries, health system planning is distributed among market participants. In others, there is a concerted effort among governments, trade unions, charities, religious organizations, or other co-ordinated bodies to deliver planned health care services targeted to the populations they serve. However, health care planning has been described as often evolutionary rather than revolutionary. As with other social institutional structures, health systems are likely to reflect the history, culture and economics of the states in which they evolve. These peculiarities bedevil and complicate international comparisons and preclude any universal standard of performance.

Goals
According to the World Health Organization (WHO), the directing and coordinating authority for health within the United Nations system, healthcare systems' goals are good health for the citizens, responsiveness to the expectations of the population, and fair means of funding operations. Progress towards them depends on how systems carry out four vital functions: provision of health care services, resource generation, financing, and stewardship. Other dimensions for the evaluation of health systems include quality, efficiency, acceptability, and equity. They have also been described in the United States as "the five C's": Cost, Coverage, Consistency, Complexity, and Chronic Illness. Also, continuity of health care is a major goal.

Definitions
Often health system has been defined with a reductionist perspective. Some authors have developed arguments to expand the concept of health systems, indicating additional dimensions that should be considered:
 Health systems should not be expressed in terms of their components only, but also of their interrelationships;
 Health systems should include not only the institutional or supply side of the health system but also the population;
 Health systems must be seen in terms of their goals, which include not only health improvement, but also equity, responsiveness to legitimate expectations, respect of dignity, and fair financing, among others;
 Health systems must also be defined in terms of their functions, including the direct provision of services, whether they are medical or public health services, but also "other enabling functions, such as stewardship, financing, and resource generation, including what is probably the most complex of all challenges, the health workforce."

World Health Organization definition
The World Health Organization defines health systems as follows:

Financial resources

There are generally five primary methods of funding health systems:

 general taxation to the state, county or municipality
 national health insurance
 voluntary or private health insurance
 out-of-pocket payments
 donations to charities

Most countries' systems feature a mix of all five models. One study based on data from the OECD concluded that all types of health care finance "are compatible with" an efficient health system. The study also found no relationship between financing and cost control.

The term health insurance is generally used to describe a form of insurance that pays for medical expenses. It is sometimes used more broadly to include insurance covering disability or long-term nursing or custodial care needs. It may be provided through a social insurance program, or from private insurance companies. It may be obtained on a group basis (e.g., by a firm to cover its employees) or purchased by individual consumers. In each case premiums or taxes protect the insured from high or unexpected health care expenses.

By estimating the overall cost of health care expenses, a routine finance structure (such as a monthly premium or annual tax) can be developed, ensuring that money is available to pay for the health care benefits specified in the insurance agreement. The benefit is typically administered by a government agency, a non-profit health fund or a commercial corporation.

Many commercial health insurers control their costs by restricting the benefits provided, by such means as deductibles, co-payments, coinsurance, policy exclusions, and total coverage limits. They will also severely restrict or refuse coverage of pre-existing conditions. Many government systems also have co-payment arrangements but express exclusions are rare or limited because of political pressure. The larger insurance systems may also negotiate fees with providers.

Many forms of social insurance systems control their costs by using the bargaining power of the community they are intended to serve to control costs in the health care delivery system. They may attempt to do so by, for example, negotiating drug prices directly with pharmaceutical companies, negotiating standard fees with the medical profession, or reducing unnecessary health care costs. Social systems sometimes feature contributions related to earnings as part of a system to deliver universal health care, which may or may not also involve the use of commercial and non-commercial insurers. Essentially the wealthier users pay proportionately more into the system to cover the needs of the poorer users who therefore contribute proportionately less. There are usually caps on the contributions of the wealthy and minimum payments that must be made by the insured (often in the form of a minimum contribution, similar to a deductible in commercial insurance models).

In addition to these traditional health care financing methods, some lower income countries and development partners are also implementing non-traditional or innovative financing mechanisms for scaling up delivery and sustainability of health care, such as micro-contributions, public-private partnerships, and market-based financial transaction taxes. For example, as of June 2011, UNITAID had collected more than one billion dollars from 29 member countries, including several from Africa, through an air ticket solidarity levy to expand access to care and treatment for HIV/AIDS, tuberculosis and malaria in 94 countries.

Payment models
In most countries, wage costs for healthcare practitioners are estimated to represent between 65% and 80% of renewable health system expenditures. There are three ways to pay medical practitioners: fee for service, capitation, and salary. There has been growing interest in blending elements of these systems.

Fee-for-service
Fee-for-service arrangements pay general practitioners (GPs) based on the service. They are even more widely used for specialists working in ambulatory care.

There are two ways to set fee levels:
 By individual practitioners.
 Central negotiations (as in Japan, Germany, Canada and in France) or hybrid model (such as in Australia, France's sector 2, and New Zealand) where GPs can charge extra fees on top of standardized patient reimbursement rates.

Capitation
In capitation payment systems, GPs are paid for each patient on their "list", usually with adjustments for factors such as age and gender. According to OECD, "these systems are used in Italy (with some fees), in all four countries of the United Kingdom (with some fees and allowances for specific services), Austria (with fees for specific services), Denmark (one third of income with remainder fee for service), Ireland (since 1989), the Netherlands (fee-for-service for privately insured patients and public employees) and Sweden (from 1994). Capitation payments have become more frequent in "managed care" environments in the United States."

According to OECD, "capitation systems allow funders to control the overall level of primary health expenditures, and the allocation of funding among GPs is determined by patient registrations". However, under this approach, GPs may register too many patients and under-serve them, select the better risks and refer on patients who could have been treated by the GP directly. Freedom of consumer choice over doctors, coupled with the principle of "money following the patient" may moderate some of these risks. Aside from selection, these problems are likely to be less marked than under salary-type arrangements.'

Salary arrangements
In several OECD countries, general practitioners (GPs) are employed on salaries for the government. According to OECD, "Salary arrangements allow funders to control primary care costs directly; however, they may lead to under-provision of services (to ease workloads), excessive referrals to secondary providers and lack of attention to the preferences of patients." There has been movement away from this system.

Value-based care
In recent years, providers have been switching from fee-for-service payment models to a value-based care payment system, where they are compensated for providing value to patients. In this system, providers are given incentives to close gaps in care and provide better quality care for patients.

Information resources

Sound information plays an increasingly critical role in the delivery of modern health care and efficiency of health systems. Health informatics – the intersection of information science, medicine and healthcare – deals with the resources, devices, and methods required to optimize the acquisition and use of information in health and biomedicine. Necessary tools for proper health information coding and management include clinical guidelines, formal medical terminologies, and computers and other information and communication technologies. The kinds of health data processed may include patients' medical records, hospital administration and clinical functions, and human resources information.

The use of health information lies at the root of evidence-based policy and evidence-based management in health care. Increasingly, information and communication technologies are being utilised to improve health systems in developing countries through: the standardisation of health information; computer-aided diagnosis and treatment monitoring; informing population groups on health and treatment.

Management

The management of any health system is typically directed through a set of policies and plans adopted by government, private sector business and other groups in areas such as personal healthcare delivery and financing, pharmaceuticals, health human resources, and public health.

Public health is concerned with threats to the overall health of a community based on population health analysis. The population in question can be as small as a handful of people, or as large as all the inhabitants of several continents (for instance, in the case of a pandemic). Public health is typically divided into epidemiology, biostatistics and health services. Environmental, social, behavioral, and occupational health are also important subfields.

Today, most governments recognize the importance of public health programs in reducing the incidence of disease, disability, the effects of ageing and health inequities, although public health generally receives significantly less government funding compared with medicine. For example, most countries have a vaccination policy, supporting public health programs in providing vaccinations to promote health. Vaccinations are voluntary in some countries and mandatory in some countries. Some governments pay all or part of the costs for vaccines in a national vaccination schedule.

The rapid emergence of many chronic diseases, which require costly long-term care and treatment, is making many health managers and policy makers re-examine their healthcare delivery practices. An important health issue facing the world currently is HIV/AIDS. Another major public health concern is diabetes. In 2006, according to the World Health Organization, at least 171 million people worldwide had diabetes. Its incidence is increasing rapidly, and it is estimated that by 2030, this number will double. A controversial aspect of public health is the control of tobacco smoking, linked to cancer and other chronic illnesses.

Antibiotic resistance is another major concern, leading to the reemergence of diseases such as tuberculosis. The World Health Organization, for its World Health Day 2011 campaign, called for intensified global commitment to safeguard antibiotics and other antimicrobial medicines for future generations.

Health systems performance

Since 2000, more and more initiatives have been taken at the international and national levels in order to strengthen national health systems as the core components of the global health system. Having this scope in mind, it is essential to have a clear, and unrestricted, vision of national health systems that might generate further progress in global health. The elaboration and the selection of performance indicators are indeed both highly dependent on the conceptual framework adopted for the evaluation of the health systems performance. Like most social systems, health systems are complex adaptive systems where change does not necessarily follow rigid management models. In complex systems path dependency, emergent properties and other non-linear patterns are seen, which can lead to the development of inappropriate guidelines for developing responsive health systems.

An increasing number of tools and guidelines are being published by international agencies and development partners to assist health system decision-makers to monitor and assess health systems strengthening including human resources development using standard definitions, indicators and measures. In response to a series of papers published in 2012 by members of the World Health Organization's Task Force on Developing Health Systems Guidance, researchers from the Future Health Systems consortium argue that there is insufficient focus on the 'policy implementation gap'. Recognizing the diversity of stakeholders and complexity of health systems is crucial to ensure that evidence-based guidelines are tested with requisite humility and without a rigid adherence to models dominated by a limited number of disciplines. Healthcare services often implement Quality Improvement Initiatives to overcome this policy implementation gap. Although many of these initiatives deliver improved healthcare, a large proportion fail to be sustained. Numerous tools and frameworks have been created to respond to this challenge and increase improvement longevity. One tool highlighted the need for these tools to respond to user preferences and settings to optimize impact.

Health Policy and Systems Research (HPSR) is an emerging multidisciplinary field that challenges 'disciplinary capture' by dominant health research traditions, arguing that these traditions generate premature and inappropriately narrow definitions that impede rather than enhance health systems strengthening. HPSR focuses on low- and middle-income countries and draws on the relativist social science paradigm which recognises that all phenomena are constructed through human behaviour and interpretation. In using this approach, HPSR offers insight into health systems by generating a complex understanding of context in order to enhance health policy learning. HPSR calls for greater involvement of local actors, including policy makers, civil society and researchers, in decisions that are made around funding health policy research and health systems strengthening.

International comparisons

Health systems can vary substantially from country to country, and in the last few years, comparisons have been made on an international basis. The World Health Organization, in its World Health Report 2000, provided a ranking of health systems around the world according to criteria of the overall level and distribution of health in the populations, and the responsiveness and fair financing of health care services. The goals for health systems, according to the WHO's World Health Report 2000 – Health systems: improving performance (WHO, 2000), are good health, responsiveness to the expectations of the population, and fair financial contribution. There have been several debates around the results of this WHO exercise, and especially based on the country ranking linked to it, insofar as it appeared to depend mostly on the choice of the retained indicators.

Direct comparisons of health statistics across nations are complex. The Commonwealth Fund, in its annual survey, "Mirror, Mirror on the Wall", compares the performance of the health systems in Australia, New Zealand, the United Kingdom, Germany, Canada and the United States. Its 2007 study found that, although the United States system is the most expensive, it consistently underperforms compared to the other countries. A major difference between the United States and the other countries in the study is that the United States is the only country without universal health care. The OECD also collects comparative statistics, and has published brief country profiles. Health Consumer Powerhouse makes comparisons between both national health care systems in the Euro health consumer index and specific areas of health care such as diabetes or hepatitis.

Ipsos MORI produces an annual study of public perceptions of healthcare services across 30 countries. 

Physicians and hospital beds per 1000 inhabitants vs Health Care Spending in 2008 for OECD Countries. The data source is OECD.org - OECD.

See also

 Acronyms in healthcare
 Catholic Church and health care
 Clinical Health Promotion
 Community health
 Comparison of the health care systems in Canada and the United States
 Consumer-driven health care
 Cultural competence in health care
 Global health
 Genetic testing
 Health administration
 Health care
 Health care provider
 Health care reform
 Health crisis
 Health economics
 Health human resources
 Health insurance
 Health policy
 Health services research
 Healthy city
 Hospital network
 Medicine
 National health insurance
 Occupational safety and health
 Philosophy of healthcare
 Primary care
 Primary health care
 Public health
 Publicly funded health care
 Single-payer health care
 Social determinants of health
 Socialized medicine
 Timeline of global health
 Two-tier health care
 Universal health care

References

Further reading

External links
 World Health Organization: Health Systems
 HRC/Eldis Health Systems Resource Guide research and other resources on health systems in developing countries
 OECD: Health policies, a list of latest publications by OECD

Health care
Health economics
Health policy
Health care quality